The 2012 Liga Nacional Superior de Voleibol Masculino is the 9th official season of the Peruvian Volleyball League, the first round started November 16, 2011 and ended January 22, 2012 and consists of a single Round-Robyn system where all 12 teams will play once against the other 11. Due to the preparation of some of the players for the 2012 Summer Olympics, this round served as the "Apertura" round.

Competing Teams

  Circolo Sportivo Italiano (CSI)
  Flamenco (FLA)
  Hospedaje Casablanca (HCB)
  Huaquillay (HQL)
   Peerless (PRL)
  Regatas Lima (CRL)
  Universidad de Lima (UDL)
  Universidad San Martín (USM)
  Wanka (DWK)

Final standing procedure
 Match points
 Numbers of matches won
 Sets ratio
 Points ratio

Match won 3–0 or 3–1: 3 match points for the winner, 0 match points for the loser
Match won 3–2: 2 match points for the winner, 1 match point for the loser

Preliminary round

Matches

Knockout stage

Semifinals

Bronze Medal Matches

1Regatas Lima won third leg 3–0.

Gold Medal Matches

1Peerless won third leg 3–0.

Final standing

Individual awards

Most Valuable Player
 Luis Soto (Club Peerless)
Best Scorer
 Andrés Quiñonez (Hospedaje Casablanca)
Best Spiker
 Luis Soto (Club Peerless)
Best Blocker
 Héctor Manrique (Regatas Lima)
Best Server
 Luis Soto (Club Peerless)
Best Digger
 Renzo Delgado (Club Peerless)
Best Setter
 Julian Vinasco (Regatas Lima)
Best Receiver
 Jonathan Vega (Universidad San Martín)
Best Libero
 Luis Torres (Universidad de Lima)

References

External links
LNSV
Voleibol.pe

Volleyball competitions in Peru
2012 in volleyball
2012 in Peruvian sport